Luís Gabriel Sacilotto Filho (born 18 March 1983) is a Brazilian footballer who plays as a midfielder.

Career
He was signed by St Patrick's Athletic on 28 May 2003 and joined on 3 February 2005 to A.C. Perugia on loan. Sacilotto then played a season in Eccellenza for Valfabbrica, before signed by Cesena (Serie B) on 9 June 2006. In January 2007, he was loaned to Lanciano (Serie C1).

References

1983 births
Living people
Brazilian footballers
Association football midfielders
Rio Branco Esporte Clube players
St Patrick's Athletic F.C. players
League of Ireland players
A.C. Perugia Calcio players
A.C. Cesena players
S.S. Virtus Lanciano 1924 players
Latina Calcio 1932 players
U.S. Lecce players
Serie B players
Serie C players
Expatriate footballers in Italy
Footballers from São Paulo (state)
Expatriate association footballers in the Republic of Ireland